Progress Island U.S.A. is a 1973 short subject film made by the Puerto Rico Economic Development Administration to promote the burgeoning U.S. Commonwealth.

The film, produced by Fucci/Stone Productions, Inc in 1973, presents a description of Puerto Rico of the late 1960s and early 1970s. It shows some of what the island had to offer at that time. The commercial short, which is only 13 minutes long, explains that Puerto Rico is "American in every respect" except for its "360 days of sunshine," due to the results of Operation Bootstrap.

The short appeared in Mystery Science Theater 3000 episode 621, as support for the main feature, The Beast of Yucca Flats.

See also
 Mystery Science Theater 3000
 List of Mystery Science Theater 3000 episodes

External links 
 

1973 films
Puerto Rican independent films
Puerto Rican films
1970s English-language films